, provisional designation , is a centaur and damocloid orbiting the Sun with a very high inclination of almost 80°. It was discovered on 18 December 2004 by the Siding Spring Survey at the Siding Spring Observatory in Australia.

Orbit and classification 

It orbits the Sun at a distance of 3.6–12.8 AU once every 23 years and 4 months (8,520 days; semi-major axis of 8.16 AU). Its orbit has an eccentricity of 0.57 and an inclination of 79° with respect to the ecliptic. The body's observation arc begins with its official discovery observation at the Siding Spring Observatory in December 2004.

Physical characteristics 

Johnston's Archive assumes a standard albedo of 0.09 and calculates a diameter of 12 kilometers based on an absolute magnitude of 12.9.

References

External links 
 MPEC 2007-A22 : CRITICAL-LIST MINOR PLANETS (2007 JAN. 20.0 TT), Minor Planet Center
 (144908) 2004 YH32, Small Bodies Data Ferret
 
 

144908
144908
144908
144908
20041218